The 4th Parachute Division,, was a divisional-sized elite formation in the Luftwaffe during World War II.

History
It was formed in Venice, Italy, in November 1943, from elements of 2 Fallschirmjäger Division and volunteers from the Italian 184 and 185 Airborne Division Folgore parachute divisions. Its first combat action was against the Allied landings at Anzio (Operation Shingle) as part of the I. Fallschirm Korps in January 1944.

After Anzio, the division fought a rear guard action in front of Rome, and was the last German unit to leave the city on 4 June; it withdrew towards Viterbo Siena Firenze and then managed to halt the Allies at the Futa pass.
In the winter of 1944/1945 it was positioned on the Gothic Line. In March 1945, the division had to send the II Battalion, 12 Fallschirmjäger Regiment and the 2nd Company from the Pionier Battalion to the new 10 Fallschirmjager Division, which was being formed in Austria. It then fought at Rimini and Bologna and surrendered to the Allies on May 2nd 1945.

War crimes
The division has been implicated in Pedescala massacre (Veneto), between 30 April and 2 May 1945, when 63 civilians were executed.

Order of battle
Structure of the division:
 Headquarters
 10th Parachute Regiment
 11th Parachute Regiment
 12th Parachute Regiment
 4th Parachute Artillery Regiment
 4th Parachute Tank Destroyer Battalion
 4th Parachute Engineer Battalion
 4th Parachute Signal Battalion
 4th Parachute Anti-Aircraft Battalion
 4th Parachute Heavy Mortar Battalion
 4th Parachute Field Replacement Battalion
 4th Parachute Divisional Supply Group

Commander 
 Heinrich Trettner

References 
Citations

Bibliography

 Quarrie Bruce, German Airborne Divisions: Mediterranean Theatre 1942–45, Osprey Publishing, 2005, 
 Windrow Martin, Luftwaffe Airborne and Field Units, Osprey Publishing, 1972, 

Fallschirmjäger divisions
Military units and formations established in 1943
Military units and formations disestablished in 1945
War crimes of the Wehrmacht